Bays Mountain Park is a  nature park and planetarium located on Bays Mountain in Kingsport, Tennessee. Founded in 1971, it features a 44 acre lake and 40 miles of hiking trails, a nature center with a planetarium theater, fire tower, and animal habitats.  

Its nature center and outdoor native animal displays include a bobcat, raptor center, river otters, wolf pen and captive and free-roaming white-tail deer. Wolf howling sessions are held regularly where visitors can experience the sounds of the gray wolf. There is also a herpetarium with reptiles and amphibians.

The park also features an educational pontoon boat ride attraction that runs through the Bays Mountain Reservoir, called the Barge Ride.  

Other activities include hiking, orienteering, mountain biking, camping, and fishing. There is also an adventure course with a zip line and the Steadman Heritage Farmstead Museum, a 19th-century period living history farm museum.

In 2017, the Pavilion at Lily Pad Cove was added for events rentals and special events and in 2019, 75 extra parking spots were added to alleviate peak season parking issues.

Wolves of Bays Mountain 
Since 1992, Bays Mountain has been home to a pack of gray wolves. The current pack consists of eight wolves, four male and four female. Seven of those came to the park in 2014 and 2015 and the eighth has been there since 2007, making her the oldest wolf in park history. 

This is one of the few places a visitor can experience an actual wolf pack dynamic and behavior. Most places only have two or three wolves together.

References

External links
Bays Mountain Park website

Parks in Tennessee
Protected areas of Sullivan County, Tennessee
Protected areas of Hawkins County, Tennessee
Museums in Sullivan County, Tennessee
Living museums in Tennessee
Nature centers in Tennessee
Farm museums in the United States
Planetaria in the United States
Education in Sullivan County, Tennessee
Adventure parks
Protected areas established in 1965
1965 establishments in Tennessee